Tropidophorus berdmorei, commonly known as Berdmore's water skink, is a species of lizard in the family Scincidae. The species is endemic to Asia.

Geographic range
T. berdmorei is found in China, Myanmar, Thailand and Vietnam.

Etymology
The specific name, berdmorei, is in honor of British naturalist Captain Thomas Matthew Berdmore (1811–1859), who collected the holotype.

Habitat

Diet
T. berdmorei preys upon worms, insects, and small crustaceans.

Reproduction
T. berdmorei is viviparous.

References

Further reading
Boulenger GA (1887). Catalogue of the Lizards in the British Museum (Natural History). Second Edition. Volume III. Lacertidæ, Gerrhosauridæ, Scincidæ, ... London: Trustees of the British Museum (Natural History). (Taylor and Francis, printers). xii + 575 pp. + Plates I- XL. (Tropidophorus berdmorii [sic] and T. yunnanensis, p. 362).
Blyth E (1853). "Notices and Descriptions of various Reptiles, new or little-known". Journal of the Asiatic Society of Bengal 22: 639-655. (Aspris berdmorei, new species, p. 651).
Honda M, Ota H, Murphy RW, Hikida T (2006). "Phylogeny and biogeography of water skinks of the genus Tropidophorus (Reptilia: Scincidae), a molecular approach". Zoologica Scripta 35 (1): 85-95.
Smith MA (1935). The Fauna of British India, Including Ceylon and Burma. Reptilia and Amphibia. Vol. II.—Sauria. London: Secretary of State for India in Council. (Taylor and Francis, printers). xiii + 440 pp. + Plate I + 2 maps. (Tropidophorus berdmorei, p. 325).
Taylor EH (1963). "The Lizards of Thailand". University of Kansas Science Bulletin 44 (14): 687-1077. (Tropidophorus berdmorei, pp. 986–989, Figure 77).

External links
Photo of Tropidophorus berdmorei from Sangkhom Forest Reserve, Nong Khai Province, Thailand

berdmorei
Reptiles of Myanmar
Reptiles of Thailand
Reptiles of Vietnam
Reptiles of China
Reptiles described in 1853
Taxa named by Edward Blyth